

List of largest enclosed malls

 Denotes urban mall.

List of largest outlet malls

List of largest lifestyle and power centers

List of strip malls

'* Denotes urban mall
'** Denotes vertical outdoor power center

See also
List of largest shopping malls in the United States
List of shopping malls in New Jersey
List of largest enclosed shopping malls in Canada
List of largest shopping malls in the world

References

New York
Shopping malls